Ana is a solo album by the American guitarist Ralph Towner, recorded in 1996 and released on the ECM label.

Reception 
The AllMusic review by Stephen Thomas Erlewine stated: "While Towner isn't entirely successful in melding classical, jazz and new age -- he frequently meanders -- several sections of Ana are as lovely and hypnotic as anything else in his catalog".

Track listing 
All compositions by Ralph Towner
 "The Reluctant Bride" - 4:28   
 "Tale of Saverio" - 5:13   
 "Joyful Departure" - 3:58   
 "Green and Golden" - 5:06   
 "I Knew It Was You" - 4:02   
 "Les Douzilles" - 6:49   
 "Veldt" - 2:21   
 "Between the Clouds" - 1:07   
 "Child on the Porch" - 1:35   
 "Carib Crib (1)" - 1:55   
 "Slavic Mood" - 1:43   
 "Carib Crib (2)" - 1:53   
 "Toru" - 3:24   
 "Sage Brush Rider" - 4:04  
Recorded at Rainbow Studio in Oslo, Norway in March 1996.

Personnel 
 Ralph Towner — classical guitar, 12 string guitar

References 

1997 albums
Albums produced by Manfred Eicher
ECM Records albums
Ralph Towner albums
Instrumental albums